Samrat Singha (born 10 December 1989) is an Indian first-class cricketer who plays for Tripura.

References

External links
 

1989 births
Living people
Indian cricketers
Tripura cricketers
Cricketers from Tripura
People from Agartala